Reckless Living is a 1938 American comedy film directed by Frank McDonald and written by Charles Grayson. It is based on the 1922 novel Riders Up by Gerald Beaumont. The film stars Robert Wilcox, Nan Grey, Jimmy Savo, William Lundigan, Frank Jenks and Harry Davenport. The film was released on March 1, 1938, by Universal Pictures.

Plot

Cast        
Robert Wilcox as Danny Farrell
Nan Grey as Laurie Andrews
Jimmy Savo as Stuffy
William Lundigan as Stanley Shaw
Frank Jenks as Freddie
Harry Davenport as 'General' Jeff
May Boley as Mother Ryan
Charles Judels as Harry Myron
Harlan Briggs as 'Colonel' Harris
Eddie "Rochester" Anderson as Dreamboat

References

External links
 

1938 films
1930s English-language films
American comedy films
1938 comedy films
Universal Pictures films
Films directed by Frank McDonald
American black-and-white films
1930s American films